Dundee Road may refer to:
Dundee Road (Florida), State Road 542
Dundee Road (Illinois), Illinois Route 68